"Bang Bang Bang" is a song from Record Collection, the third studio album by Mark Ronson, released under the moniker Mark Ronson & The Business Intl. The song features rapper Q-Tip and singer MNDR. It was released as the album's lead single on 9 July 2010 in the United Kingdom.

The song is based on the popular French children's song "Alouette", which means "skylark". The chorus directly references lyrics from "Alouette" including the line "Je te plumerai la tête", which means "I shall pluck your head". The beginning of the music video also depicts a young girl singing the opening lines to "Alouette". "Bang Bang Bang" debuted at number six on the UK Singles Chart with 50,170 copies sold in its first week.

Critical reception
Anthony Hill from Clickmusic describes "Bang Bang Bang" as having "the impromptu charm and inexorable appeal of a 1980s New York block party". Hill further comments, "'Un, deux, trois' slams the intro, revealing the exact number of seconds it takes Mark Ronson's latest effort to gatecrash its way into the brain. Once lodged among the neurons, it deftly impels every muscle and limb to move spasmodically to its infectious beat."

Music video

The music video was directed by Warren Fu.

Daniel Kreps from Rolling Stone described the video as:

Bookended by two seemingly unrelated pieces of footage – a fictitious retro commercial for sandwich spread and a dramatic tennis match –  stars Ronson as the guest on an offbeat, '70s-style Japanese talk show. When he's asked to chat about his music, Ronson transforms into a smooth Bryan Ferry figure and hops behind a bank of synthesisers to perform his latest composition. The clip is equal parts American Bandstand and Tron – and the most effective time-capsule music video since Snoop Dogg resurrected the Rick James era with "Sexual Eruption".

In February 2011, music video blog Yes, We've Got a Video! ranked the song's music video at number nine on their list of the Top 30 Videos of 2010, adding that "there's plenty to be enjoyed in basically every second of this".

Usage in media
"Bang Bang Bang" was featured in episodes of Gossip Girl, 90210, CSI: Crime Scene Investigation and Entourage. The song was also used in the 2011 comedy film No Strings Attached and appears on its soundtrack. It was used diegetically during the warehouse party scene of season 1, episode 7 of Girls. The song was used by E4 to promote the sixth series of The Big Bang Theory. It is also heard in the Episode of Entourage, Sniff Sniff Bang Bang

The song is featured in the soundtrack of the PlayStation Vita game Lumines Electronic Symphony.

German band Deichkind's song Bück dich Hoch is strongly inspired by this song.

Track listings

Amazon MP3 single
"Bang Bang Bang" – 4:05
"Bang Bang Bang" (Count and Sinden Remix) – 5:23

iTunes EP
"Bang Bang Bang" – 4:05
"Bang Bang Bang" (Count and Sinden Remix) – 5:21
"Bang Bang Bang" (Russ Chimes Remix) – 6:12

US iTunes EP
"Bang Bang Bang" – 4:05
"Bang Bang Bang" (Count and Sinden Remix) – 5:22
"Bang Bang Bang" (Russ Chimes Remix) – 6:10
"Bang Bang Bang" (SBTRKT Remix) – 3:50

12" single
A1. "Bang Bang Bang" (Album Version) – 4:05
A2. "Bang Bang Bang" (Russ Chimes Remix) – 6:10
B1. "Bang Bang Bang" (Count and Sinden Remix) – 5:22
B2. "Bang Bang Bang" (SBTRKT Remix) – 5:02

Personnel
Credits adapted from 12" single liner notes.

 Mark Ronson – production
 Ona Ascoli – backing vocals
 Victor Axelrod – keyboards
 Thomas Brenneck – recording
 Joseph Elmhirst – backing vocals
 Tom Elmhirst – mixing
 Emmett Farley – assistant recording
 Brian Gardner – mastering
 Nick Hodgson – backing vocals
 Peter Wade Keusch – engineering, vocal production, synths, writing
 Mat Maitland – art direction, imagery
 Vaughan Merrick – additional engineering, editing, programming, recording

 MNDR – keyboards, vocals
 Nick Movshon – bass
 Rob Murray – recording
 Dan Parry – mixing assistant
 Q-Tip – vocals
 Gerard Saint – art direction
 Scarlet Smith – backing vocals
 Bryony Shearmur – portraits
 Stevie Smith – backing vocals
 Homer Steinweiss – drums
 Amanda Warner – additional programming

Charts

References

2010 singles
2010 songs
Columbia Records singles
Franglais songs
Mark Ronson songs
MNDR songs
Q-Tip (musician) songs
Song recordings produced by Mark Ronson
Songs written by Mark Ronson
Songs written by MNDR
Songs written by Q-Tip (musician)
Songs written by Peter Wade Keusch
Songs based on children's songs
Music videos directed by Warren Fu